Quillabamba is a city in southern Peru.  It is the capital of La Convención Province, which is the largest province in area of the Cusco Region.  It is located in an area called the high jungle. Agriculture is the most important activity, principally coffee, cacao, tea and coca. The town is a mixture of Andean and Amazonian migrants.

The Urubamba River flows by the town from the south.  It is a source of gold and rare-earth minerals.

Notable residents

 Raul Geller (born 1936), Peruvian-Israeli footballer

See also 
Chukchu
Populated places in the Cusco Region